The following is a list of all team-to-team transactions that have occurred in the National Hockey League during the 2008–09 NHL season.  It lists what team each player has been traded to, signed by, or claimed by, and for which players or draft picks, if applicable.

Free agency

May/June Trades

July/August

September

October

November

December

January

February

March (Trade deadline March 4th)

June

See also
2008–09 NHL season
2008 NHL Entry Draft
2008 in sports
2009 in sports
2007–08 NHL transactions
2009–10 NHL transactions

References

 tsn.ca Free Agent signings
 The Hockey News Transaction log
 espn.com transactions
 sportsnet.ca Free Agent signings

National Hockey League transactions
Trans